Erebia callias, the Colorado alpine, is a member of the Satyridae subfamily of the Nymphalidae butterflies. It is found in alpine areas of Wyoming and Colorado in the U.S. Rocky Mountains as well as various mountain ranges in eastern Asia.

The wingspan is 35–38 mm. The upperside is dull gray brown with a slight luster. Two eyespots are near the tip both above and below on the forewing. These are usually located in a red patch. The underside of the hindwing is silver gray with very small dark markings.

The larvae probably feed on grasses and sedges. Its habitats include alpine tundra and arctic-alpine meadows.

Subspecies
Erebia callias callias (Rocky Mountains)
Erebia callias sibirica Staudinger, 1881 (Saur and Tarbagatai Mountains)
Erebia callias altajana Staudinger, 1901 (Altai Mountains)
Erebia callias simulata Warren, 1933 (Sayan Mountains)
Erebia callias tsherskiensis Dubatolov, 1992 (Far East)

Taxonomy
Erebia callias has been lumped with the Siberian brassy ringlets as they are almost alike morphologically. Though one might suspect stronger differentiation and perhaps marked cryptic speciation across the wide range, the Rocky Mountains population is apparently a very recent isolate. Its ancestors apparently crossed over the Bering Strait at the end of the Wisconsinian glaciation, about 15,000 to 10,000 years ago.

References

External links
Butterflies and Moths of North America

Erebia
Butterflies described in 1871
Butterflies of Asia
Butterflies of North America
Taxa named by William Henry Edwards